Stephen (often rendered as Latin Stephanus) Kim Sou-hwan (May 8, 1922 – February 16, 2009) was a cardinal of the Roman Catholic Church and the former archbishop of Seoul, South Korea. Having been an iconic figure in South Korea's bloody and tumultuous transition from military rule to democracy, he was widely respected across all sections in South Korean society.

Early years 
He was born in Daegu, modern-day South Korea, and attended high school in Seoul.  He studied philosophy at Sophia University in Tokyo from 1941 to 1944, and at Catholic University of Korea in Seoul from 1947 to 1951, when he graduated.  After serving briefly as a parish priest in Andong and then as a secretary in the Archdiocese of Daegu, he traveled to Germany to study sociology at Münster University from 1956 to 1963.

Career 
Kim was raised to the rank of cardinal-priest of San Felice da Cantalice a Centocelle by Pope Paul VI in the consistory of April 28, 1969, having become the archbishop of Seoul in 1968 after being the bishop of Masan since 1966. At the age of 46, he was the youngest member of the College of Cardinals at that time. He received the Mugunghwa medal in 1970, and participated in the two conclaves of 1978.

During Park Chung-hee and his successor's military dictatorship of the '70s and the '80s, the Korean Catholic Church under Kim's leadership was highlighted as a focal point of South Korea's democratization movement.

In 1998, Cardinal Kim retired as the archbishop of Seoul, shortly after serving as president-delegate of the Special Assembly for Asia of the World Synod of Bishops. On the death of Franz Koenig in 2004, he became the senior member of the college in terms of service, as he was the first of the three surviving members elevated in 1969 on the list of that consistory. However, Kim was ill at the time, and in the ceremonies of the sede vacante on the death of Pope John Paul II, the duties of protopresbyter (senior cardinal priest) were instead carried out by Eugenio de Araujo Sales, another 1969 cardinal who was Kim's junior as cardinal but senior as a priest and as a bishop.

Having reached the age of 80 in 2002, he did not participate in the ensuing conclave as he was no longer eligible to vote in papal elections. Cardinal Kim did arrive for the papal inauguration of Pope Benedict XVI and there he did discharge the duties of the cardinal protopresbyter.

Death 
From 2007, Kim's health gradually deteriorated, and he was seldom seen in public, the last time being the 2008 Christmas Midnight Mass at Myeongdong Cathedral. He died in Seoul on February 16, 2009, from respiratory problems. During a four-day lying in state period some 400,000 Catholic mourners were said to have filed past his coffin in the city's Myeongdong Cathedral. He was buried on February 20. As per his will, he donated his organs, and the Cardinal's eyes were quickly used in two successful cornea transplants.

Written
 이 땅에 평화를 - 김수환 추기경과의 대화, 1988 
 참으로 사람답게 살기위하여 - 김수환 추기경의 세상 사는 이야기 (사람과 사람, 1998) 
 우리가 서로 사랑한다는 것, 1999 
 너희와 모든 이를 위하여, 1999

See also
 Beyond That Mountain, a 2020 biographical film based on Stephen Kim Sou-hwan's childhood.

References

External links
catholic-pages bio of Stephen Kim Sou-hwan
Cardinal Stephen Kim Sou-hwan, Cardinals of the Holy Roman Church
Cardinal Stephen Kim Sou-hwan Catholic Hierarchy

1922 births
2009 deaths
Roman Catholic archbishops of Seoul
South Korean Roman Catholic archbishops
People from Daegu
South Korean cardinals
20th-century Roman Catholic archbishops in South Korea
Sangji University alumni
Cardinals created by Pope Paul VI
Gwangsan Kim clan
Roman Catholic bishops of Pyongyang
Roman Catholic bishops of Masan
Respiratory disease deaths in South Korea